Colfax Theater was a historic theater building in South Bend, St. Joseph County, Indiana. It was built in 1928, and was a two-story, irregularly shaped brick building with a glazed terra cotta facade. The auditorium seated 2,000 patrons.  The second story featured a multi-paned Palladian window.  It was demolished in 1991 to accommodate an expansion of the neighboring South Bend Tribune.

It was listed on the National Register of Historic Places in 1985, and delisted in 1993.

References

Former National Register of Historic Places in Indiana
Theatres on the National Register of Historic Places in Indiana
Theatres completed in 1928
Buildings and structures in St. Joseph County, Indiana
National Register of Historic Places in St. Joseph County, Indiana
Demolished buildings and structures in Indiana
Buildings and structures demolished in 1994